Saturnus is a genus of skippers in the family Hesperiidae.

Species
Recognised species in the genus Phlebodes include:
 Saturnus saturnus (Evans, 1955)

References

Natural History Museum Lepidoptera genus database

Hesperiinae
Hesperiidae genera